Estering is a rallycross race track situated in Buxtehude, Lower Saxony Germany. It primarily ran the German round of the FIA European Rallycross Championship until 2019. It also ran the World RX of Germany event of the FIA World Rallycross Championship from 2014 to 2018 before being dropped in 2019.

References

External links

Motorsport venues in Germany
World Rallycross circuits